Hydrocephalus ("water head") is an extinct genus of redlichiid trilobite that was very common during the Middle Cambrian of Eurasia and North America, which lasted from 508 to 497 million years ago. This trilobite is up to 20 cm long and more widely built than others of the time. In comparison to other members of its family, its glabella appears swollen.

Gallery

References

Redlichiida genera
Cambrian trilobites
Paradoxidoidea
Fossils of the Czech Republic
Fossils of Sweden
Fossil taxa described in 1846
Taxa named by Joachim Barrande